Phyllonorycter suberifoliella is a moth of the family Gracillariidae. It is found from southern France and the Iberian Peninsula to Greece.

There are at least two generations per year.

The larvae feed on Quercus ilex and Quercus suber. They mine the leaves of their host plant. They create a lower-surface tentiform mine.

References

suberifoliella
Moths of Europe
Moths described in 1850